Barton County (standard abbreviation: BT) is a county located in the U.S. state of Kansas. As of the 2020 census, the county population was 25,493. Its county seat and most populous city is Great Bend.  The county is named in honor of Clara Barton, responsible for the founding of the American Red Cross. It is the only one of Kansas' 105 counties to be named for a woman.

History

Early history

For many millennia, the Great Plains of North America was inhabited by nomadic Native Americans.  From the 16th century to 18th century, the Kingdom of France claimed ownership of large parts of North America.  In 1762, after the French and Indian War, France secretly ceded New France to Spain, per the Treaty of Fontainebleau.

19th century

In 1802, Spain returned most of the land to France, but keeping title to about 7,500 square miles.  In 1803, most of the land for modern day Kansas was acquired by the United States from France as part of the 828,000 square mile Louisiana Purchase for 2.83 cents per acre.

In 1854, the Kansas Territory was organized, then in 1861 Kansas became the 34th U.S. state.  In 1867, Barton County was established and named for Clara Barton. It is the only Kansas county named for a woman.

In 1878, Atchison, Topeka and Santa Fe Railway and parties from Marion County and McPherson County chartered the Marion and McPherson Railway Company.  In 1879, a branch line was built from Florence to McPherson, in 1880 it was extended to Lyons, in 1881 it was extended to Ellinwood.  The line was leased and operated by the Atchison, Topeka and Santa Fe Railway.  The line from Florence to Marion, was abandoned in 1968.  In 1992, the line from Marion to McPherson was sold to Central Kansas Railway. In 1993, after heavy flood damage, the line from Marion to McPherson was abandoned.  The original branch line connected Florence, Marion, Canada, Hillsboro, Lehigh, Canton, Galva, McPherson, Conway, Windom, Little River, Mitchell, Lyons, Chase, Ellinwood.

21st century
In 2001, an F4 tornado hit Hoisington during Hoisington High School's prom.

Geography
Barton County was drawn in the shape of a  square. The geographic center of Kansas is located in Barton County.

Adjacent counties
Ellis County (northwest)
Russell County (north)
Ellsworth County (northeast)
Rice County (southeast)
Stafford County (south)
Pawnee County (southwest)
Rush County (west)

Major highways
Sources:  National Atlas, U.S. Census Bureau
 U.S. Route 56
 U.S. Route 281
 Kansas Highway 4
 Kansas Highway 96
 Kansas Highway 156

Demographics

The Great Bend Micropolitan Statistical Area includes all of Barton County.

As of the 2000 census, there were 28,205 people, 11,393 households, and 7,530 families residing in the county.  The population density was 32 people per square mile (12/km2).  There were 12,888 housing units at an average density of 14 per square mile (6/km2).  The racial makeup of the county was 92.98% White, 1.15% Black or African American, 0.51% Native American, 0.23% Asian, 0.01% Pacific Islander, 3.51% from other races, and 1.60% from two or more races.  Hispanic or Latino of any race were 8.31% of the population.

There were 11,393 households, out of which 31.30% had children under the age of 18 living with them, 55.10% were married couples living together, 7.80% had a female householder with no husband present, and 33.90% were non-families. 30.20% of all households were made up of individuals, and 14.30% had someone living alone who was 65 years of age or older.  The average household size was 2.41 and the average family size was 3.01.

In the county, the population was spread out, with 26.00% under the age of 18, 9.00% from 18 to 24, 25.10% from 25 to 44, 22.00% from 45 to 64, and 17.90% who were 65 years of age or older.  The median age was 39 years. For every 100 females there were 93.80 males.  For every 100 females age 18 and over, there were 90.10 males.

The median income for a household in the county was $32,176, and the median income for a family was $39,929. Males had a median income of $28,803 versus $20,428 for females. The per capita income for the county was $16,695.  About 9.90% of families and 12.90% of the population were below the poverty line, including 17.00% of those under age 18 and 10.90% of those age 65 or over.

Government

Presidential elections
Prior to 1940, Barton County was a Democratic-leaning swing county in presidential elections, being a national bellwether from 1912 to 1936. From 1940 on, it has become a Republican Party stronghold, with the solitary Democratic Party presidential candidate to carry it since then being Lyndon B. Johnson in his national landslide of 1964.

Laws
Barton County was a prohibition, or "dry", county until the Kansas Constitution was amended in 1986 and voters approved the sale of alcoholic liquor by the individual drink with a 30% food sales requirement.  The food sales requirement was removed with voter approval in 2004.

Education

Colleges
 Barton Community College

Unified school districts
The five school districts are part of the special education area of Barton County called Barton County Special Services.
 Central Plains USD 112
 Ellinwood USD 355
 Great Bend USD 428
 Hoisington USD 431
 Otis-Bison USD 403 (Rush County)

Communities

Cities

Albert
Claflin
Ellinwood
Galatia
Great Bend
Hoisington
Olmitz
Pawnee Rock
Susank

Census-designated place
 Odin

Other unincorporated communities

 Beaver
 Boyd
 Dartmouth
 Dent Spur
 Dubuque
 Dundee
 Farhman
 Heizer
 Hitschmann
 Millard
 Redwing
 South Hoisington
 Stickney

Townships
Barton County is divided into twenty-two townships.  The cities of Ellinwood, Great Bend, and Hoisington are considered governmentally independent and are excluded from the census figures for the townships.  In the following table, the population center is the largest city (or cities) included in that township's population total, if it is of a significant size.

See also
 National Register of Historic Places listings in Barton County, Kansas

References

Further reading

County
 Atlas and Plat Book of Barton County, Kansas; Kenyon Co; 55 pages; 1916.
 Plat Book of Barton County, Kansas; North West Publishing Co; 47 pages; 1902.

Trails
 The Story of the Marking of the Santa Fe Trail by the Daughters of the American Revolution in Kansas and the State of Kansas; Almira Cordry; Crane Co; 164 pages; 1915.
 The National Old Trails Road To Southern California, Part 1 (LA to KC); Automobile Club Of Southern California; 64 pages; 1916.

External links

County
 
 Barton County - Directory of Public Officials
Maps
 Barton County Maps: Current, Historic, KDOT
 Kansas Highway Maps: Current, Historic, KDOT
 Kansas Railroad Maps: Current, 1996, 1915, KDOT and Kansas Historical Society

 
Kansas counties
1867 establishments in Kansas
Populated places established in 1867
Kansas